Jack Sures (November 20, 1934 – May 12, 2018) was a Canadian ceramic artist and post-secondary academic.

Personal background
Sures was born at Brandon, Manitoba in 1934. He graduated from the University of Manitoba in 1957 with a B.F.A. He went on to earn his M.A. in painting and printmaking from the Michigan State University in 1959. After two years working in the United Kingdom and traveling in Europe and the Middle East he established a studio in Winnipeg, Manitoba. He was instrumental in establishing the ceramics department at the University of Saskatchewan, Regina Campus (now the University of Regina). He undertook an appointment in 1973-1974 working in Grenada, West Indies for the United Nations Handcraft Development Program. Sures died on May 12, 2018 at the age of 83.

Body of work
After completing his M.A. Sures moved to the United Kingdom where he worked in London. Here he learned mold making, slip casting and production wheel-throwing. His works are wheel-thrown vessel-based pieces and hand-built sculpture. 
Sures has worked on various commissions, the most notable being:
Mural created for the Provincial Office Building in Saskatoon
Mural for the Museum of Civilization in Ottawa. 
Ceramic pieces for Secretary of State Canada; 
Terrazzo floor for the Wascana Rehabilitation Centre, Regina

Arts administration
Sures has taken a strong interest in arts organizations. He has acted as an adviser or consultant for a number of organizations including the Canada Council regarding ceramic art; the Banff Centre for their facilities and program development; the Regina Wascana Centre Authority on its Fine Arts Committee; and as a member of the Board of the Canadian Conference of the Arts.

Selected collections
Sures' works are in both private and public collections including;
Saskatchewan Arts Board
External Affairs Canada
Province of Saskatchewan
University of Saskatchewan
Pecs National Museum, Hungary
University of Regina
Musée national des beaux-arts du Québec

Academic positions
Sures was Chairman of the Department of Visual Arts at the University of Regina from 1969-71. On his retirement in 1998 he was granted Professor Emeritus.

Awards
Sures has been recognized for his accomplishments by the grant of honours including;
Saidye Bronfman Award, 2018
Saskatchewan Arts Award for Lifetime Achievement, 2017
Canada Council Study Grant 1965 and 1972 to study in Japan and France respectively. 
Awarded Grand Prize, International Ceramic Exhibition, Mino, Japan, 1989 
Order of Canada, inducted as Member, 1991
Province of Saskatchewan, Recognized for contributions to Canada and the Province, 1992.
Saskatchewan Order of Merit, 2003
Alumni Association Award for Excellence in Undergraduate Teaching, University of Regina, 1991
Alumni Association Award for Excellence in Research, University of Regina, 1992
International Academy of Ceramics, Elected as member
Commemorative Medal of the 125th Anniversary of The Confederation of Canada, Recognition for Significant Contribution to Compatriots and to Canada
Queen's Diamond Jubilee Medal, 2012

External images
Footed Bowl
Retrospective of Works
Clay and Glass Retrospective

See also
List of Canadian artists

References

External links
Ceramics Today Article 
Encyclopedia of Saskatchewan 
U Regina Bio 
U of Manitoba Bio
Saskatchewan Artists

1934 births
2018 deaths
Artists from Manitoba
Canadian ceramists
Companions of the Order of Canada
Michigan State University alumni
People from Brandon, Manitoba
University of Manitoba alumni
Academic staff of the University of Regina